The Master of the Sword, or MOSH, is the title of the head of the Department of Physical Education and the director of the program of physical instruction at the United States Military Academy at West Point.  This position is unique in that the physical program at the academy is both academic and non-academic.  Some of the courses are taught in a classroom or laboratory environment and some elements of the physical program are stand-alone testing and non-tested events that must be completed by all cadets during their time at the academy.  The first Swordmaster was Pierre Thomas, appointed by Congress in 1814. There have been 27 Masters of the  Sword since 1814. Despite its position as a department head since 1948, the Master of the Sword was not made a member of the Academic Board at West Point until 1974, with the appointment of Colonel James L. Anderson. The only woman to serve as MOS was COL Maureen LeBoeuf, serving 1997–2004.  The current master of the sword, serving since 2015, is Colonel Nicholas Gist.

Masters of the Sword

References

United States Military Academy